A List of Czech films, the earliest silent films before 1920.

1898–1919 

1890s
Czech
Czech
Czech